Lennuk is a painting by Nikolai Triik of 1910,  depicting Lennuk, the ship of Kalevipoeg, son of Kaleva, from the Estonian national epic Kalevipoeg.

The work measures 73.8 cm by 137 cm and is painted in tempera and pastel on paper.

It is part of the collection of the Art Museum of Estonia and is exhibited in the Kumu Art Museum in Tallinn.

References

External links
 Bifrost.it Lennuk 
 Sirp.ee Kaks Nikolai Triiki (Brad Pushaw, translated by Ulla Juske, 7 August 2014) 

1910 paintings
Collections of the Art Museum of Estonia
Estonian paintings
Maritime paintings